Champigny-lès-Langres (literally Champigny near Langres) is a commune in the Haute-Marne department in north-eastern France.

See also
Communes of the Haute-Marne department

References 

Champignyleslangres
Lingones